Pusher is a 1996 Danish crime thriller film co-written and directed by Nicolas Winding Refn, in his film debut. A commercial success considered to be influential in Danish film history, it marked Mads Mikkelsen's film debut.

The film is set in the criminal underground of Copenhagen, Denmark, and tells the story of the drug dealer Frank (Kim Bodnia) who, after losing a large amount of money in a drug deal gone wrong, falls into desperation as he only has a few days to raise the money he owes.

Although Pusher was not intended to become a franchise, financial difficulties forced Winding Refn to produce two sequels: Pusher II, focusing on Mikkelsen's character after the events of the first film, and Pusher 3, focusing on another secondary character introduced in Pusher; both were financial and critical successes. A Hindi remake of the same name was released in 2010, as well as an English-language remake in 2012.

Plot
The film begins in Copenhagen with a low-level drug dealer Frank (Kim Bodnia) going to a heroin deal with his sidekick Tonny (Mads Mikkelsen). The pair only manage to sell some of their product, and then waste time about town. Frank then visits his friend Vic (Laura Drasbæk), a prostitute who holds some of Frank's stash for a fee. Vic wants to have a serious relationship with Frank, but Frank prefers to keep it purely casual.

Frank is visited by a former cell mate, a Swede named Hasse (Peter Andersson), and the pair set up a large drug deal. Frank visits his supplier, the Serbian local drug lord Milo (Zlatko Burić), to get the heroin. Already owing Milo some money, Frank cannot cover the cost of the heroin, but Milo allows him to take the drugs provided that he immediately returns with the money.

The deal goes bad, however, when police arrive. In the process of evading the police, Frank dumps the heroin in a lake. At the station, police officers convince Frank that Tonny has delivered a confession that implicates Frank, but he still does not admit to anything. When Frank is released after 24 hours he returns to Milo to explain how he lost the money and the drugs. Milo does not believe Frank's story and demands that he pay back even more than he already owes. Frank then immediately seeks Tonny out and savagely beats him with a baseball bat.

Milo's henchman Radovan (Slavko Labović) accompanies Frank to help him collect on some of his own debts to use toward his debt with Milo. The pair have a friendly conversation and Radovan shares his secret desire to open a restaurant. Radovan tries to force an addict customer of Frank's to rob a bank to cover his debt, but the addict commits suicide in front of them. As Frank makes other disastrous attempts to earn money, Vic becomes increasingly insistent that they behave as a couple. He takes her to several clubs and makes plans to drive her to the veterinarian to see her sick dog.

Frank finally makes a deal, but his drug mule betrays him and switches the heroin for baking soda. Radovan drops his friendly demeanour and begins threatening Frank with serious injury should he fail to pay up soon. Frank goes on a desperate rampage, stealing money and drugs from the gym of some drug-dealing bodybuilders, but he is soon picked up by Radovan and tortured. Frank manages to escape and makes plans to flee with Vic to Spain. After successfully making his final deal in Copenhagen, Frank receives a call from Milo, who promises to accept a token payment to put an end to their feud. However, Milo and his henchmen are actually planning to kill Frank when he arrives. When Frank bluntly informs Vic that their plans to flee are cancelled, she steals his stash of money and runs off.

The film ends with Frank grimly catching his breath as his enemies throughout the city prepare to dispose of him.

Cast
 Kim Bodnia as Frank, a low-level drug-dealer
 Zlatko Burić as Milo, a powerful Serb drug lord, with a fondness for baking
 Laura Drasbæk as Vic, a high-class prostitute and Frank's girlfriend
 Slavko Labović as Radovan, Milo's enforcer and aspiring restaurateur
 Mads Mikkelsen as Tonny, Frank's cheerful but manic partner
 Vanja Bajičić as Branko, Radovan's cousin and Milo's thug
 Peter Andersson as Hasse, a Swedish drug-dealer
 Lisbeth Rasmussen as Rita, Frank's untrustworthy drug mule
 Levino Jensen as Mike, a bodybuilding drug-dealer
 Thomas Bo Larsen as a drug addict who owes Frank money
 Lars Bom as one of the officers who interrogates Frank
 Nicolas Winding Refn as Brian, a young man who buys drugs from Frank and Tonny
 Gordon Kennedy as Scorpion, a customer of Frank, whom Frank bullies during a drug deal
 Jesper Lohmann as Mikkel

Production

Development
The movie began as a five-minute "short" that Winding Refn had made as an application to a Danish film school. Refn turned down the offer he subsequently received, instead deciding to transform Pusher into a feature-length independent film utilizing a nominal amount of funding that he had managed to acquire.

Refn partnered with film student Jens Dahl to write the film's screenplay. His goal was to tell the story of a man under pressure, without glamorizing the lifestyle of a drug dealer. Refn organized the plot's events according to the days of the week in his notes and this was subsequently established in the final product. Refn's major inspirations for the film were The Battle of Algiers, Cannibal Holocaust, The French Connection, The Killing of a Chinese Bookie and Mean Streets.

Filming
During rehearsal, Winding Refn became dissatisfied with the actor he had cast as Frank, thinking him too placid and boring. Two weeks before shooting was to begin, Winding Refn fired the actor without a replacement in line. Winding Refn approached Kim Bodnia, who was an established actor at the time, and Bodnia accepted. Though the other primary roles were mostly filled with experienced actors, many of the minor roles were filled by Winding Refn's friends or people accustomed to the street life.

Bodnia brought a greater degree of intensity and aggressiveness to the part that some actors were not prepared for. Winding Refn claimed that the surprised reactions of some actors are genuine, as they had not rehearsed with Bodnia beforehand and were expecting the previous actor's more sedate performances.

Slavko Labović, who played the Serbian thug Radovan, was a friend of Serbian war criminal Željko Ražnatović. He provided a poster of Ražnatović to use as a prop in Milo's headquarters. The actor playing Milo, Zlatko Burić, is actually a Croat. Winding Refn became concerned when violence flared between Serbs and Croats during filming, but the events did not cause problems on set.

The film was shot using Danish union rules, which allowed no more than 8 hours of filming per day, and no filming on weekends. The rules, combined with the high cost of filming permits, caused time and budget constraints. The film was shot entirely using hand-held cameras. Winding Refn wanted to capture a realistic, documentary feel to the film. This caused problems with the time constraints of the shooting schedule and Winding Refn's desire to keep the film shadowy. Actors are often backlit or difficult to see due to the low levels of lighting used.

The film was shot almost completely in chronological order. Winding Refn later admitted that shooting scenes out of order was confusing to him, but some scenes were reshot or added later. The scene in which Frank shoots at Milo's thugs was originally filmed without special effects, but Winding Refn was dissatisfied with the results and reshot the scene using squibs. The scene with the junkie was shot after shooting had completed to replace a previous scene that Refn discarded because it dealt with an outdated vision of Frank's character.

Soundtrack

Punk rocker Peter Peter and composer Povl Kristian composed the score and formed the temporary band Prisoner to perform the score, with Peter playing guitar and Kristian playing the clavier. Kristian also composed the song "Summers got the colour" with text by Lars K. Andersen which was sung by Aud Wilken. Although Povl Kristian did not return to work on the sequels, the "Pusher theme" he wrote with Peter Peter was used in all of the following films.

Reception
The film was considered the first Danish-language gangster film and became a breakthrough success for Winding Refn and several of the lead actors. Winding Refn claimed that the film inspired cults of highly dedicated fans and influenced Danish fashion to emulate certain costumes worn by the characters. Kim Bodnia launched a very successful career as a leading man in Danish cinema largely due to the success of the film. Zlatko Burić was given a Bodil Award in 1997 for his performance as Milo.

The film holds a score of 83% positive reviews on Rotten Tomatoes with an average score of 7.1/10. The review aggregator site Metacritic has given the movie an average score of 72 out of 100, which means "generally favorable reviews".

Sequels

Two sequels followed, focusing on different characters from the same "underworld" milieu of Copenhagen.

Pusher II follows Frank's former partner, Tonny, who struggles with his relationship with his father following his release from prison; Tonny concurrently negotiates the prospect of becoming a father himself and the discovery that his mother had died while he was incarcerated. Pusher ends with Frank stranded in Copenhagen with no friends or resources, while his enemies poise to strike. Dialogue in Pusher II suggests that Milo, at least, never caught up with Frank.

Pusher 3 follows drug lord, Milo. Milo is followed through the course of a hectic day, as he struggles with his attempt at sobriety, a series of problematic criminal deals, and his daughter's birthday celebration for which he is the chef.

Two remakes additionally followed: a Hindi remake of the same name released in 2010, and an English-language remake in 2012.

References

External links
 
 

Pusher (film series)
1996 films
1996 crime thriller films
Danish crime thriller films
1990s Danish-language films
Films about organized crime in Denmark
Films about the illegal drug trade
Films directed by Nicolas Winding Refn
Films shot in Denmark
Films set in Copenhagen
Gangster films
1996 directorial debut films